= Kortana =

- Town
- Location within Pakistan
- Coordinates: 33.28°N 73.18°E
- Country: Pakistan
- Province: (Islamabad Capital Territory) Islamabad C.T
- Elevation: 555 m (1,821 ft)

Population
  - Total: 42,231
- Time zone: UTC+5 (PST)

Kortana is a town in the Islamabad Capital Territory of Pakistan. It is located at 33°28′20″N 73°18′0″E with an altitude of 555 metres (1,824 ft).
